The  was a Japanese political party that existed in the early 1990s. It was founded in 1993 by 44 members of the Liberal Democratic Party led by Tsutomu Hata and Ichirō Ozawa. It was instrumental in ending the LDP's 38-year dominance of Japanese politics.

Both reformers, Hata and Ozawa had been involved in a difficult leadership struggle within the former Takeshita faction of the LDP. Their opponents, led by Keizo Obuchi and Ryutaro Hashimoto, were using the fallout of the Sagawa Kyubin scandal as a tool to undermine the reformist position. Hata and Ozawa split from the party partly to shift media attention away from the scandal. In doing so, they transformed an internal party dispute to a wide-ranging conflict that led to a decade of shifting allegiances and short-lived parties.

In the elections immediately following the split, the JRP won 55 seats, making it one of the most powerful opposition parties. Most importantly, the party drew off support crucial to the LDP. While several other small parties had split from the LDP, Hata and Ozawa's group was the largest, and was widely considered to have finally broken the back of LDP dominance.

Known for his political organisational skills, Ozawa organised a five-party coalition  of the JRP, the Japan Socialist Party, the Democratic Socialist Party, Komeito and the United Social Democratic Party. This coalition held 237 seats in the Diet, and after convincing the Japan New Party and the New Party Sakigake to join, was able to form a government under Morihiro Hosokawa.

As the impetus for the collapse of LDP power, the JRP was able to exert great power in the coalition. While some concessions to other parties were made, the JRP was perhaps overly dominant, eventually forcing some other members out of the coalition through its heavy-handed style. In 1994, the JRP merged into the New Frontier Party.

Presidents of JRP

Election results

References

Conservative parties in Japan
Defunct conservative parties
Defunct political parties in Japan
Neoconservative parties
Political parties established in 1993
Political parties disestablished in 1994
1993 establishments in Japan
1994 disestablishments in Japan